Louisa Clare Harland (born 1993 or 1994) is an Irish actress. She is best known for her role as Orla McCool in the Channel 4 sitcom Derry Girls.

Early life
Born in Dublin to a Northern Irish father, Harland has two older sisters, Katie and Ellie. She was part of the Ann Kavanagh Youth Theatre in Rathfarnham. She trained at the Mountview Academy of Theatre Arts in London.

Career

Television and film
Upon graduation, Harland landed a recurring role as Kayleigh in the RTÉ One series Love/Hate in 2011. She later appeared in films Rob Burke's Standby (2014) and Woody Harrelson's Lost in London (2017).

In 2017, it was announced Harland had been cast as Orla McCool, the eccentric cousin of Erin Quinn (Saoirse-Monica Jackson), in the Channel 4 sitcom Derry Girls. The first series aired in January 2018, receiving critical and commercial acclaim, and the second in March 2019.

On 26 June 2020, Harland and her fellow Derry Girls costars performed a sketch with Saoirse Ronan for the RTÉ fundraising special RTÉ Does Comic Relief, with proceeds from the night going towards those affected by the COVID-19 pandemic.

Radio 
In March 2021, Harland performed with Sam Otto in an adaptation of the play Endless Second, by Theo Toksvig-Stewart, for BBC Radio 4. That May, she performed in an adaptation of the debut novel Snowflake, by Louise Nealon, for BBC Radio 4.

Filmography

Film

Television

Stage

References

External links 
 

Living people
Year of birth missing (living people)
21st-century Irish actresses
Actresses from Dublin (city)
Alumni of the Mountview Academy of Theatre Arts
Irish film actresses
Irish stage actresses
Irish television actresses